Skin and Bones is the fifth studio album by the German band Lyriel. Containing a mix of folk rock, gothic metal and symphonic metal, it was recorded without former band member Steffen Feldmann and published in September 2014.

Style
Skin and Bones has been described as more powerful and harder than the band's previous releases. The musical genres include folk rock and celtic rock as well as gothic and symphonic metal. Swedish vocalist Christian Älvestam contributed harsh vocals as a guest singer on the track "Black and white".

Reception

According to the Sonic Seducer, Lyriel had managed to combine the emotional aspects of the various tracks on Skin and Bones with a pressing sound, which was harder than their earlier albums. The reviewer noted singer Jessica Thierjung's skills and concluded that the album had been produced well. Also the Rock Hard magazine stated that Lyriel had now learned from past criticism that their sound was lacking harder components. At the same time though the reviewer remarked that the band had not yet gotten rid of kitschy and "arbitrary" songs.

Track listing

Personnel
The production personnel for Skin and Bones include the following:

Lyriel
Jessica Thierjung – vocals
Tim Sonnenstuhl – guitars
Joon Laukamp – violin
Oliver Thierjung – bass, backing vocals
Marcus Fidorra – drums
Linda Laukamp – cello, backing vocals

Additional personnel
Christian Älvestam – vocals on "Black and white"
Hiko – cover art, layout
Thomas Plec Johansson – mixing
Robert Schuller – acoustic guitar
Sebastian Sonntag – backing vocals
Alexander Wenk – backing vocals
Martin Ahman – keyboards and fx

References

2014 albums
Lyriel albums
AFM Records albums